Flor Jelithza Lora de la Cruz, most known as Yelitza Lora (born 12 July 1985), is a Radio and TV hostess, dancer, model, and theatre and film actress from the Dominican Republic.

When she was 11 years old, Lora won the beauty pageant Nuestra Belleza Infantil. She then worked as dancer and model in several TV shows in the Dominican Republic.

After losing weight in 2009, she obtained several jobs in various television and radio programs. In 2010 she participated in the reality show LA FINCA by Tania Baez, in that program she won a lot of popularity for being the leader for the other participants and for the rumors of her romance with the urban singer Vakero.

In 2012, Lora was introduced by Alfonso Rodriguez to the film industry with her appearance in Feo De Dia Lindo De Noche and since then it is a propeller of cinema in the Dominican Republic, she created his own film producer Princesa Films. Today, Yelitza Lora is a recognized brand in her country with more than 20 years of experience in the entertainment industry. She is a business woman and a leading female for her generation, her career is business administration and she is dedicated to business development in different areas, her first company is Otra Cosa, a phrase that has also become a slogan.

Career

TV

"La Máquina del 4" (dancer, model)
"Cuánto Vale El Show" (dancer, model)
"La Fiesta del Consumidor" (co-presenter)
"" (co-presenter)
"La Alegría del Medio Día"
"Show Del Mediodía"
"Perdone la Hora"
"Que Noche"
"La Finca"
"A Reir con Miguel y Raymond"
"Yelitza Lora en "Otra Cosa

Radio

"Las Tardes con Raymundo Ortiz" 
"Parando El Trote" with Irving Alberti
"Sobre Un Par De Tacones" with Hony Estrella
"Otra Cosa Radio Show"

Theatre

"Que Hacemos Con El Muerto"
Radio Bemba 
Escuela Para Maridos 
Los Hombres De Mi Vida

Film

Bendecidas (announced) 
Calle Sin Salida (post-production) 
Dos Policias en Apuros 
El Pelotudo
La Extraña
Feo De Dia Lindo De Noche

References

External links

 
 
 

Living people
1985 births
Dominican Republic people of Spanish descent
Dominican Republic people of French descent
Dominican Republic radio personalities
Radio and television announcers
Dominican Republic television presenters
Dominican Republic film actresses
Dominican Republic stage actresses
People from Santo Domingo
Dominican Republic women television presenters
White Dominicans